Maxime Bernier  (born January 18, 1963) is a Canadian politician who is the founder and leader of the People's Party of Canada (PPC). Formerly a member of the Conservative Party, Bernier left the caucus in 2018 to form the PPC. He was the member of Parliament (MP) for Beauce from 2006 to 2019 and served as a Cabinet minister in the Harper government.

Prior to entering politics, Bernier worked in law, finance and banking. He was first elected to the House of Commons as a Conservative in the 2006 election in the same riding his father, Gilles Bernier, had represented from 1984 to 1997. Bernier held a number of portfolios in Prime Minister Stephen Harper's Cabinet. He was industry minister from 2006 to 2007 before being promoted to foreign affairs minister until he stepped down in 2008 after failing to secure confidential documents. He continued to sit as a back-bench MP until 2011, when he was appointed as Minister of State for small business and tourism. Following the 2015 election, while the Conservatives were no longer in power, Bernier was re-elected as an MP.

Bernier ran for the Conservative Party leadership in the 2017 leadership election. After leading eventual winner Andrew Scheer through 12 rounds of voting, he came second with over 49 per cent in the 13th round. Fifteen months later, in August 2018, Bernier resigned from the Conservative Party to create his own party, the People's Party of Canada, citing disagreements with Scheer's leadership. He lost his parliamentary seat in the 2019 election to Conservative Richard Lehoux, ending parliamentary representation of the PPC. Bernier later ran in the by-election for York Centre in October 2020, but lost to Ya'ara Saks with 3.56 per cent of the vote. He lost to Lehoux in Beauce a second time in the 2021 election.

Bernier has taken economic libertarian positions on issues such as opposing supply management in the Canadian dairy industry and government subsidies for arenas. He is against mass immigration to Canada, supports repealing the Multiculturalism Act, and rejects the scientific consensus on climate change. During the COVID-19 pandemic in Canada, he opposed mandatory vaccinations, public health measures, and attended many anti-lockdown protests; he was arrested for violating public health orders at a gathering in Manitoba.

Early life and education
Bernier was born in Saint-Georges, Quebec, the son of Doris (Rodrigue) and Gilles Bernier, a well known radio host, who represented the riding of Beauce from 1984 to 1997, first as a Progressive Conservative and then as an independent. In a 2010 interview with John Geddes, Bernier said he respects his father as a Mulroney-era politician, but tries not to emulate his style. Bernier has stated that his views were shaped from his upbringing in Beauce to his life experiences. He is the second oldest child and has two sisters, Brigitte and Caroline, and a brother, Gilles Jr. In his teens, Bernier played football as a member of the Condors, the team of the Séminaire St-Georges, that won the Bol d'Or in 1980 at the Olympic Stadium.

Bernier obtained a Bachelor of Commerce degree from the Université du Québec à Montréal, completed his law degree at the University of Ottawa and was called to the Quebec Bar in 1990, of which he is still a member.

Early career
For 19 years, Bernier held positions in law, several financial and banking fields, such as working as a lawyer at McCarthy Tétrault, rising up to become branch manager at the National Bank, the office of the Securities Commission of Québec as Director of Corporate and International Relations, an adviser (handling fiscal reform) from 1996 to 1998 in the office of Bernard Landry—Quebec's finance minister and Deputy Premier of Quebec at the time—and Standard Life of Canada as the Vice-President of Corporate Affairs and Communication. He also served as Executive Vice-President of the Montreal Economic Institute, a Quebec free-market think tank, where he authored a book on tax reform.

Political career
In 2005, Bernier became the Conservative candidate for Beauce in the 2006 federal election. Stephen Harper had asked Bernier's father to re-enter politics, and the latter suggested that his son should run instead. Bernier won 67 per cent of the vote, the largest majority for a Conservative politician outside Alberta. His ties to Beauce and his support for provincial jurisdictions (which was endorsed by former Social Credit party leader Fabien Roy) were factors in his win. Some political pundits believed Bernier's ideas led to the unexpected Conservative breakthrough in Quebec during the election.

Minister of Industry (2006)
Bernier was a high-profile new MP from Quebec; on February 6, 2006, he was appointed Minister of Industry and minister responsible for Statistics Canada. As the Minister of Industry, he also served as the Registrar General. During his time as Industry Minister, Bernier started reformation of the telecommunications industry, particularly on local phone service. Professor Richard J. Schultz from McGill University lauded his attempt to deregulate the telecommunications industry, calling him "the best Industry Minister in 30 years, without challenge". James Cowan from Canadian Business, called Bernier's tenure "a golden age" for Canadian business policy.

Minister of Foreign Affairs (2007)

On August 14, 2007, Bernier was appointed as Minister of Foreign Affairs, replacing Peter MacKay, who became the Minister of National Defence. The rumour is that appointment had to do with preventing Bernier from pushing his personal views such as opposing corporate welfare farther as industry minister. During the beginning of his tenure, Bernier's personality and charm received praise among foreign dignitaries.

In May 2008, it was revealed that, one month earlier, Bernier inadvertently left a confidential briefing book at the home of his girlfriend, Julie Couillard. While Prime Minister Stephen Harper originally defended Bernier, he ultimately accepted Bernier's resignation on May 26, 2008 saying, "It's only this error. It's a very serious error for any minister. The minister immediately recognized the gravity of that error." The incident made Bernier rethink his political career and he decided to avoid taking government information out of his parliamentary office in future.

Recalling his tenure as foreign minister, Bernier felt unsatisfied due to the Prime Minister's Office controlling the portfolio, making it harder for him to implement his views on Canadian foreign policy.

Backbench (2008–2011)
Six days before the 2008 election, Couillard released a book which was supposed to reveal Bernier's confidential opinions such as his personal objection to Canadian involvement in the Iraq War. The English version peaked at No. 6 on La Presses bestseller list while the French version reached No. 5. However, the book was viewed negatively by some of Bernier's constituents. He was re-elected with 62 per cent of votes, and was made chair for the National Defense Select Committee.

In 2009, Bernier started a blog and spent the next four years travelling across Canada to discuss political issues. Bernier's speeches were criticized by Jean-Pierre Blackburn, Raymond Blanchard and Tom Mulcair, but praised by Andrew Coyne, Warren Kinsella, and André Pratte.

In September 2010, after Bernier's Quebec colleagues pushed for the federal government to invest $175 million in the Centre Vidéotron in Quebec City, Bernier opposed the proposed project and a feasibility study by Ernst & Young. He stated the proposal made little financial sense. The government later decided against the investment. He later revealed that his colleagues were furious because they wanted to use the investment to "Buy votes".

It was rumoured that Conservative Party insiders wanted Bernier to become leader of the Action démocratique du Québec (ADQ) party if Stephen Harper's preferred choice, Mario Dumont, became Quebec lieutenant, and that Bernier was considering a leadership run. In 2009 there was a movement to draft Bernier for ADQ leadership. Bernier called the attention flattering, but declined to run.

Minister of State (2011–2015)
On May 18, 2011, Bernier was appointed as Minister of State (Small Business and Tourism),  a junior ministerial post. Bernier did not enjoy being bound by the principle of cabinet solidarity, and disliked being named to a minor department, but accepted the role out of deference to his colleagues and to regain credibility via a return to the cabinet. Bernier later said he also accepted the position because he felt he did not accomplish enough in his career and expressed a desire to end the budget deficit.

His responsibilities were expanded with his appointment on July 15, 2013 as Minister of State (Small Business, Tourism, and Agriculture). During this time, he led the Red Tape Reduction Commission, which created a rule that for every regulation added another one has to be cut.

In opposition (2015–2016)
On November 20, 2015, Bernier was appointed by interim Conservative Leader Rona Ambrose as Critic for Economic Development and Innovation. He resigned on April 7, 2016 to run in the Conservative Party's leadership election.

In March 2016 Bernier introduced a motion to require Bombardier executives to explain, to the Industry Committee, the reasoning for the federal government to bail them out. Bernier argued Bombardier should restructure itself rather than seek public funds. Justin Trudeau's Liberal government blocked Bernier's motion.

Campaign for the Conservative leadership (2016–2017)
At a conservative conference in March 2016, Bernier said that China has "less government and more freedom" than Canada; a video of the speech was later circulated by the Broadbent Institute's Press Progress. Bernier said that he was referring to economic freedom, not political freedom, and said that his remarks should not be construed to suggest that he supported Chinese dictatorship.

On April 7, 2016, Bernier filed his nomination to be a candidate in the 2017 Conservative Party of Canada leadership election, saying that he was running to promote his views and ideas on four principles: freedom, responsibility, fairness, and respect.

In May 2016, Bernier broke from his Conservative colleagues on supply management, the Canadian agricultural system in which a form of insurance is granted to farmers. He said that there was no way to reconcile the Canadian system with his "free-market principles".

After the Conservative Party decided to remove the traditional definition of marriage from their constitution, Bernier was one of few leadership contenders to march in the Toronto Pride Parade.

Bernier achieved unexpectedly high levels of support, finishing a close second in the 13th and final round of voting on May 27, 2017, taking 49.05 per cent of the vote to Andrew Scheer's 50.95 per cent. A few days after the results, Michael Chong, another leadership candidate, argued that both his and Bernier's campaigns represented "real change, significant change" to the party but felt they wanted the status quo.

Reactions from pundits
Nathan Giede of the Prince George Citizen wrote that Bernier was "the living reincarnation of all Laurier's good ideas and Dief the Chief's pan-Canadian optimism". In the Times Colonist, Bernier stated, "They can call me a fiscal conservative, they can call me a conservative who believes in freedom, they can call me reasonable libertarian, call me anything you want—call me Max, call me Maxime, call me 'Mad Max'." Occasionally, he displayed a sense of humor which helped him gain voters' attention. William Watson argued in the National Post that although some of Bernier's policies were reflective of the role "rugged individualism" played in Canada's past, and may have played a role in his loss, they could also affect Canada's future. Stanley Hartt, who was chief of staff to Prime Minister Brian Mulroney, found Scheer's victory not "stirring" and suggested that Scheer should have taken ideas from Bernier's economic platform, which Hartt praised.

Post-leadership campaign (2017–2018)
On August 31, 2017, Bernier was re-appointed critic for Innovation, Science and Economic Development Canada by Andrew Scheer.

After it was revealed that the 2015 Conservative campaign team knew about sexual assault allegations against former Conservative MP Rick Dykstra, on January 31, 2018, Bernier publicly demanded answers as he was heading towards a caucus meeting into the handling of the nomination as did Conservative MP Brad Trost, who tweeted in favor of Bernier statement. After the meetings, Scheer reversed his previous decision. and called for a third-party investigation.

Bernier intended to publish a book, Doing Politics Differently: My Vision for Canada. In April 2018, he pre-released a chapter on his publisher's website explaining why he made the abolition of Canada's supply management system an issue during the leadership campaign. The chapter referred to Quebec's dairy farmer lobby as "fake Conservatives" because they opposed his abolition of the supply management policy and supported Scheer's candidacy. However, in deference to his Conservative colleagues who saw the chapter as an attack on the Scheer, Bernier agreed to postpone publication of the book indefinitely for the sake of party unity, while also saying that the book was not about his leadership campaign, but about important ideas. He later told the Toronto Star in an email that he defended his comments and that the book would someday be published.

On June 12, 2018, Scheer dismissed Bernier from the Official Opposition shadow cabinet, saying that Bernier had violated his pledge to delay publication of the book by posting the chapter on his website on June 5, after it had been removed by from the publisher's website. Bernier denied that he broke the pledge, saying that the published excerpts had previously been publicly released on his publisher's website. During an At Issue panel after Bernier's demotion, Chantal Hebert was critical of Bernier decision to publish the chapter, Coyne found Bernier to be a victim of "a political setup" and Paul Wells thought Scheer was being "paranoid". On June 15, Bernier stated in an interview that he believed his stance on supply management was the real reason behind his dismissal, not his decision to post the chapter.

In a series of Twitter posts in August 2018, Bernier garnered attention for criticizing Prime Minister Trudeau's comments about "diversity is our strength". He later tweeted that naming a park in Winnipeg after Muhammad Ali Jinnah, was an example of "extreme multiculturalism". The tweets were broadly seen as divisive and inflammatory with calls for him to be reprimanded or removed from caucus such as John Ivison; However, Conservative leader Andrew Scheer stated Bernier "speaks for himself" amid calls for Bernier to be expelled from the party's caucus. Scheer later claimed that he did not use identity politics to gain support; which Bernier issued a series of tweets counter-arguing the point. Others such as Mathieu Bock-Côté, Lise Ravary and Neil Macdonald defended his comments by writing op-eds to counter arguing critics. While, Tom Walkom, Deborah Levy and Andre Valiquette found his critique common within mainstream Quebec. In his resignation speech, Bernier, had an issues with Scheer's response, and later clarified that he wanted to have a conversation about "ethnic division". When asked about his tweets by Question Period, he responded by stating "Instead of always promoting the diversity in our country, why not promote what unites us. That's the most important." Commentator Colby Cosh later wrote that Bernier had previously praised ethnic diversity, while also "objecting to its elevation to cult status".

Formation of People's Party of Canada (2018–2019)

On August 23, 2018, Bernier announced that he was leaving the Conservative Party with the intention of founding a new political party. He held a press conference at which he declared that the Conservative Party was "too intellectually and morally corrupt to be reformed", and was afraid to address important issues or articulate a coherent philosophy.

Bernier's departure was criticized by former Conservative Prime Ministers Stephen Harper and Brian Mulroney. Harper suggested that Bernier was a sore loser, while Mulroney said that Bernier's creation of a new party would split the vote and make it more likely that Trudeau's Liberals would win the 2019 election. Conversely, Bernier's decision was praised as courageous by columnist Christie Blatchford. In a National Post op-ed, Bernier stated that his establishment of a new party aimed to reverse what he called a  "public choice dynamic" in Canadian politics, that led to vote-buying and "pandering" by the main political parties.

On September 14, 2018, Bernier announced the creation of the People's Party of Canada, saying the party would advocate for "smart populism", which Bernier defined as policies based on principles of freedom, responsibility, fairness, and respect. Bernier positioned the People's Party to the right of the Conservative Party; the party has been variously described as conservative, libertarian, right-wing populist, classical liberal, far-right, and alt-right. In December 2018, some of its founding signatories were shown to have ties to American white nationalist and anti-immigrant groups. The party later told Le Devoir that they did not have enough resources to vet them at the beginning of the PPC's formation.

2019 federal election
Campaigning in advance of the 2019 Canadian federal election, Bernier and his chief strategist, Martin Masse, aligned the People's Party with the anti-immigrant European New Right. Bernier called for steep cuts to immigration to Canada and criticized multiculturalism, his focus on issues like cutting immigration marking a change in his public profile that contrasted with his earlier focus (while in the Conservative Party) on free-market, economic libertarian stances such as telecom monopolies and deregulation. Bernier also proposed reductions in federal income tax, called for a reduction of the federal role in healthcare and the replacement of the Canada Health Transfer, and proposed the replacement of the Indian Act. He was the only leader of a party represented in the House of Commons to reject the scientific consensus on climate change. He said he would do "nothing" to deal with climate change, and that Canada should withdraw from the Paris Agreement on carbon emissions.

On September 2, 2019, Bernier posted a series of tweets in which he called Swedish climate activist Greta Thunberg "mentally unstable". On September 4, after receiving widespread backlash, Bernier backpedalled.

In the election in October 2019, Bernier was challenged for his seat in Beauce by Conservative candidate Richard Lehoux, a fourth-generation dairy farmer and past president of the Fédération Québécoise des Municipalités. He lost over 20 per cent of his vote from 2015, finishing with 28.3 per cent to Lehoux's 38.6 per cent, with the Bloc Québecois and Liberals finishing a distant third and fourth, respectively. Nationally, Bernier was the only PPC candidate to come within sight of being elected; no other candidate won more than six per cent of the vote, and the party as a whole won only 1.6 per cent of the popular vote.

In February 2020, he launched a lawsuit alleging defamation by Warren Kinsella for branding Bernier a racist, in relation to the 2019 election, on behalf of the Conservative Party of Canada. The lawsuit sought an admission of defamation and $325,000 in damages. In November 2021, the court dismissed the lawsuit, based on Ontario's Anti-SLAPP legislation, determining that it was not proven that the defamation concerns outweighed the importance of protecting free speech. Bernier was ordered in February 2022 to pay $132,000 in legal costs to Kinsella.

Since December 2019
Upon the December 2019 resignation of Scheer from Conservative Party leadership, Bernier stated he would not be interested in returning to the Conservative Party. In January 2020, he announced an upcoming TV series with the English title The Max Bernier Show and French title Les nouvelles de Maxime.

Bernier announced his intention to run in a by-election when seats became vacant from the resignations of Bill Morneau and Michael Levitt over the summer of 2020. He confirmed his candidacy for Levitt's former Toronto riding of York Centre shortly after the date of the October 26, 2020 by-election was announced. He finished fourth with 642 votes (3.56 per cent).

COVID-19 pandemic and 2021 election 

Bernier was strongly critical of public health measures undertaken to combat the COVID-19 pandemic, having travelled to anti-lockdown protests throughout the country in 2021. On April 17, he spoke to several hundred people in Barrie, Ontario, despite being discouraged from doing so by the mayor and the area's city councilor. He and MPP Randy Hillier were both ticketed for their participation in a rally in Peterborough on April 24 for violating the Reopening Ontario Act. The day before, they had been told not to attend by mayor Dianne Therrien.

He attended a protest in Montreal on May 2. The crowd was large enough that it closed the mass vaccination clinic at the Olympic Stadium, where the protest began. He spoke along with Chris Sky in Regina, Saskatchewan on May 8, and received a $2800 ticket. In Waterloo, Ontario, he and several other PPC candidates from neighbouring regions spoke at a rally on June 6. Waterloo's mayor, Dave Jaworsky, described their attendance as a political campaign rally that was "beyond shocking" during a pandemic. Bernier was arrested and fined by the Royal Canadian Mounted Police (RCMP) on June 11 in St-Pierre-Jolys, Manitoba after attending a rally against COVID-19 restrictions, which was itself in violation of health restrictions. He paid $1000 bail, cancelled the remainder of his tour in Manitoba, and returned to Montreal the next day. In August, he said that he would not receive a COVID-19 vaccine.

Bernier ran in his old riding of Beauce for the 2021 election and again lost to Richard Lehoux. The People's Party concluded its leadership review in December and he was confirmed and continued as leader.

He supported Freedom Convoy 2022 in Ottawa.

Personal life
Bernier has two daughters. In 2010, he began a relationship with Catherine Letarte, a National Ballet School-trained ballerina, who worked for a women's shelter and as of 2017 runs a community centre for adults living with mental health issues. Bernier and Letarte married in the summer of 2019. Bernier is fond of quoting James M. Buchanan, Friedrich Hayek, and Henry Hazlitt and has been known as "Mad Max", the "Bloc-buster", or the "Albertan from Quebec" by his Ottawa colleagues.

In September 2013, Bernier trained for and ran an ultramarathon across his riding to raise funds for a local food bank. In 2014, Bernier participated in the Rodeo de Cochons after being challenged by a local mayor.

Works
 
 Doing Well and Doing Better: Health Services Provided to Canadian Forces Personnel with an Emphasis on Post-traumatic Stress Disorder : Report of the Standing Committee on National Defence
 Canada's Arctic Sovereignty: Report of the Standing Committee on National Defence
 Doing Politics Differently: My Vision for Canada – Chapter 5 "Live or die with supply management"

Electoral history

Notes

References

External links

 Conservative Party of Canada biography
 Maxime Bernier's Official Blog
 Doing Politics Differently
 
 Final Report on the Administrative Review into the Security Incident Reported By Maxime Bernier

1963 births
Canadian classical liberals
Canadian libertarians
Canadian Ministers of Foreign Affairs
Canadian political party founders
Conservative Party of Canada MPs
Critics of multiculturalism
French Quebecers
Lawyers in Quebec
Leaders of political parties in Canada
Living people
Members of the 28th Canadian Ministry
Members of the House of Commons of Canada from Quebec
Members of the King's Privy Council for Canada
People from Saint-Georges, Quebec
People's Party of Canada
Université du Québec à Montréal alumni
University of Ottawa alumni
University of Ottawa Faculty of Law alumni
Right-wing populism in Canada